The 2018 Idol Star Athletics Bowling Archery Rhythmic Gymnastics Foot Volleyball Championships was held at Goyang Gymnasium in Goyang, South Korea on August 20 and 27, 2018 and was broadcast on MBC on September 25 and 26, 2018.

Synopsis
The show features male and female K-pop entertainers, which competes in various sports competitions. To shorten the competition, every competition (except 60 m individual sprints and 4x100 relay) had only four teams involved in a single knockout. Men's footvolley made its debut to competition, replacing Male Team Aerobics.

Footvolley is the only 4-on-4 competition where teams are composed of members from different idol groups, and non-idol coaches provide instructions for two teams from the same bracket, so they have less likelihood of facing each other. Teams can bounce once before having to attack or defend, and touch between two teammates before hitting to the other side. Coaches can review twice, where all umpires and line judges (five members in total) will discuss the ruling, majority voting wins. First to 15 wins the round, best of three rounds wins.

Archery reverts to full 10-shot format for all rounds. To avoid confusion, however, the elected ace member from each team takes the final four shots, while the other two take three each.

Ten-pin bowling was filmed on a separate location on a separate date. The scoring has also been simplified. A strike is 30 points, a spare, depending on the first attempt, is from 10–19 points. Consecutive strikes and spares do not add together, and no bonus frames after a strike on the 10th frame, so the perfect score remains at 300 points.

Cast

Presenters
Jun Hyun-moo, Super Junior's Leeteuk and Twice's Nayeon hosted the show. Girl's Day Yura was the special host for male bowling.

Main
Full 2018 ISAC Chuseok's line-up

Male 
Wanna One, Seventeen, Stray Kids, VIXX, NU'EST W, The Boyz, NCT, Astro, UNB, ONF, Blanc7, Golden Child, Myteen, 14U, and MXM, Shindong (Super Junior), Yang Sei-hyung.

Female

(G)I-dle, CLC, KHAN, H.U.B., Girlkind, GWSN, Nine Muses, Dreamcatcher, Limesoda, Red Velvet, Momoland, April, Pristin, ELRIS, GFriend, Cosmic Girls, Weki Meki, GBB, Twice, Fromis 9, Flashe, Hey Girls.

Results
References:

Men
Athletics

Archery

Bowling

Foot Volleyball

Women
Athletics

Rhythmic Gymnastics

Archery

Bowling

Ratings

References

External Links

 2018 Idol Star Athletics Archery Rhythmic Gymnastics Aerobics Championships

MBC TV original programming
South Korean variety television shows
South Korean game shows
2018 in South Korean television
Idol Star Athletics Championships